WVKR-FM (Independent Radio) is a college radio station owned by and primarily staffed by students of Vassar College in Poughkeepsie, New York. The station broadcasts on 91.3 MHz at 3,700 watts ERP from a tower in Milton, New York with a directional signal to the south. The station also streams on the web.

History

When Vassar College became a co-educational institution in 1969, the school began plans to launch a campus radio station to serve both the campus and the nearby communities. Originally, the college planned to apply for a low-power license, however plans soon changed to a full-power licence when the tower site of WEOK-FM was donated to Vassar College after the construction of a new tower in Illinois Mountain in Marlboro. WVKR signed on from this tower on a test basis in December 1971 with full operations commencing after upgrades to the tower were made in March 1972.

For its entire existence, WVKR has been a primarily student-run station with a core staff of community volunteers running some programs on the station. Key programming on the station includes 
blues, jazz, hip hop, vintage rock, polka music, world music, classical, Cajun/Zydeco, talk, and indie rock, among others.

One of the longest running programs on the station, "Pete Clark's Orphanage of Rock and Roll," features rare rock and pop from the 60s 70s and 80s. It has run on WVKR for close to two decades on Friday afternoons from 3pm to 5pm.

Doug Price and his Friday night Blues After Hours have been known and loved by Blues fans throughout Dutchess County since the late 1980s.

WVKR also streams its broadcast on the internet, accessible through its website, thus serving not only the Vassar College and Hudson Valley communities, but also anyone else in the world who chooses to listen to the webcast.

Through its history WVKR has had several notable disk jockeys (DJs) who went on to further success in the music field; these include:
 Pete Clark (major market DJ and programmer, currently also doing a Sunday show at WPDH)
 Mark Ronson (DJ, Musician, Producer)
 DJ Ayres (Noted Club DJ)
 John Conway (Member The Bravery)
 DJ Mr. Vince (DJ/Co-host of internationally syndicated radio show "Full Throttle Radio World Wide" Hosted By Fatman Scoop & Mixshow DJ On 96.1FM WPKF)

External links
Official website

Official WVKR Blog
WVKR's Live-Updated Playlists on Radioactivity

Vassar College
VKR-FM
VKR-FM
Radio stations established in 1971